Halberton Halt railway station served the village of Halberton, Devon, England, from 1927 to 1964 on the Tiverton branch line.

History 
The station was opened on 5 December 1927 by the Great Western Railway. It was situated beneath Lower Town bridge. It closed on 5 October 1964.

References 

Disused railway stations in Devon
Former Great Western Railway stations
Railway stations in Great Britain opened in 1927
Railway stations in Great Britain closed in 1964
1927 establishments in England
1964 disestablishments in England